Nupserha bipunctata is a species of beetle in the family Cerambycidae. It was described by Per Olof Christopher Aurivillius in 1914.

Subspecies
 Nupserha bipunctata bipunctata (Aurivillius, 1914)
 Nupserha bipunctata hartwigi Breuning, 1964

References

bidentata
Beetles described in 1914